The Serampore Trio was the name given to three pioneering English missionaries, namely  William Carey (1761-1834), Joshua Marshman, (1768-1837), and William Ward (1769-1823). William Carey arrived in Bengal in 1793 and Marshman and Ward arrived in 1799. They became known as the Serampore Trio.

William Carey
Joshua Marshman
William Ward

New college in Serampore

On 5 July 1818, Carey, Marshman and Ward issued a prospectus (written by Marshman) for a proposed new "College for the instruction of Asiatic, Christian, and other youth in Eastern literature and European science". Thus was born Serampore College - which still continues to this day.

At times funds were tight, and after a brief and false rumour alleging misapplication of funds caused the flow of funds being raised by Ward in America dried up, Carey wrote, "Dr. Marshman is as poor as I am, and I can scarcely lay by a sum monthly to relieve three or four indigent relatives in Europe. I might have had large possessions, but I have given my all, except what I ate, drank, and wore, to the cause of missions, and Dr. Marshman has done the same, and so did Mr. Ward."

The trio's aim was to give an education in arts and sciences to students of every "caste, colour or country" and to train people for ministry in  the growing church in India (See: Christianity in India).

From its beginning the College has been ecumenical but this means that it has no automatic basis of support from any one branch of the Christian church. Prior to 1818, the Serampore Trio had worked together in providing education for their own children and the children,  including females, of the native Indians.

Pictures

References

Arts of transitional India twentieth century, Volume 1 By Vinayak Purohit
National Council of Churches review, Volume 126
Muslims and missionaries in pre-mutiny India By Avril Ann Powell
Banglapedia: national encyclopedia of Bangladesh, Volume 3
Encyclopedia of evangelicalism By Randall Herbert Balmer
Christianity Today

19th century in Kolkata
Baptist missionaries in India